Robert Coleman Atkins (October 17, 1930 April 17, 2003) was an American physician and cardiologist, best known for the Atkins Diet, which requires close control of carbohydrate consumption and emphasizes protein and fat as the primary sources of dietary calories in addition to a controlled number of carbohydrates from vegetables.

The commercial success of Atkins' diet plan led Time to name the doctor a person of the year in 2002. The Atkins diet has been described as "one of the most popular fad diets in the United States".

Early life and education
Atkins was born in 1930 in Columbus, Ohio, the son of Eugene and Norma (Tuckerman) Atkins. His family was Jewish. At the age of 12, his family moved to Dayton, Ohio, where his father owned several restaurants. As a young teen, Atkins held various jobs, including a position selling shoes at the age of 14 and a later gig on a local radio show. He attended Fairview High School in Dayton and, in 1947, finished second among 8,500 seniors on a statewide general scholarship test. Upon graduating from the University of Michigan in 1951, Atkins had thoughts of becoming a comedian and spent the summer as a waiter and entertainer at various resorts in the Adirondacks.

He eventually decided to pursue medicine, however, and received a medical degree from Cornell University Medical College in 1955. Atkins completed an internship at Strong Hospital in Rochester, New York, and finished his residency in cardiology and internal medicine at hospitals affiliated with Columbia University.

Career
Atkins specialized in cardiology and complementary medicine, and went on to open a private practice on the Upper East Side of New York City in 1959. His medical practice did not go well at first, and he began to put on weight and became depressed. After doing some research, he decided to pursue a low-carbohydrate approach published by Alfred W. Pennington, based on research Pennington did during World War II at DuPont. He began applying this approach in his practice, and began writing books about low-carb diets that became known as the Atkins diet, publishing his first book in 1972 and a few years later opening a complementary medicine center. He married his wife, Veronica, when he was 56.

In 2002, Atkins went into cardiac arrest, leading many of his critics to point to this episode as proof of the inherent dangers in the consumption of high levels of saturated fat associated with the Atkins diet. In numerous interviews, however, Atkins stated that his cardiac arrest was not the result of poor diet, but was rather caused by a chronic infection.

Death
On April 7, 2003, Atkins fell and hit his head on an icy New York sidewalk. He was admitted to Weill Cornell Medical Center, where he underwent surgery to remove a blood clot from his brain, but fell into a coma. He died on April 17, at age 72.

According to Stuart Trager, chairman of the Atkins Physicians Council (a group of physicians who work as consultants to the Atkins organization), this report contained incomplete medical records and Atkins did not have a history of heart attacks; instead, according to Trager, Atkins had cardiomyopathy, a heart muscle disease that was probably caused by a virus, not his diet. His widow refused to allow an autopsy.

Diet

The Atkins Diet is a low-carbohydrate diet promoted by Atkins.

His success inspired others to generate low-carb diets, and many companies released low-carb diets and low-carb foods. After his death, the popularity of Atkins' diet waned, with other low-carb diets eroding its market share and questions being raised about its safety. In 2005, Atkins Nutritionals filed for bankruptcy. It was subsequently purchased by North Castle Partners in 2007 and switched its emphasis to low-carb snacks. In 2010, the company was acquired by Roark Capital Group.

Books
 Atkins, Robert C. Dr. Atkins' Diet Revolution Bantam, 1972
 
 Atkins, Robert C. Dr. Atkins' Diet Cookbook Bantam, 1974
 Atkins, Robert C. Dr. Atkins' SuperEnergy Diet Bantam, 1978
 Atkins, Robert C. Dr. Atkins' SuperEnergy Diet Cookbook Signet, 1978
 Atkins, Robert C. Dr. Atkins' Nutrition Breakthrough Bantam, 1981
 Atkins, Robert C. Dr. Atkins' Health Revolution Houghton Mifflin, 1988
 Atkins, Robert C. Dr. Atkins' New Diet Revolution M. Evans and Company, 1992
 
 Atkins, Robert C. Dr. Atkins' Quick & Easy New Diet Cookbook Simon and Schuster, 1997
 Atkins, Robert C. Dr. Atkins' Vita-Nutrient Solution: Nature's Answers to Drugs Simon and Schuster, 1997
 Atkins, Robert C. Dr. Atkins' Age-Defying Diet St. Martin's Press, 2001, 2002
 Atkins, Robert C. Dr. Atkins' New Diet Revolution M. Evans and Company, 2002
 *

References

Further reading

 Larry King interview
 BBC Obituary: Dr Robert Atkins April 17, 2003
 Snopes on Doctor Atkins' death

1930 births
2003 deaths
20th-century American male writers
20th-century American non-fiction writers
20th-century American physicians
21st-century American male writers
21st-century American non-fiction writers
21st-century American physicians
Accidental deaths from falls
Accidental deaths in New York (state)
American cardiologists
American health and wellness writers
American male non-fiction writers
American nutritionists
Columbia University staff
Low-carbohydrate cookbook writers
Low-carbohydrate diet advocates
Pseudoscientific diet advocates
University of Michigan alumni
Weill Cornell Medical College alumni
Writers from Columbus, Ohio
Writers from Dayton, Ohio
Writers from Manhattan